Andrew Newman (born 7 January 1978 in Leicester, England) is a former Welsh international rugby union player who played for Glasgow Warriors at the Lock position.

Rugby Union career

Amateur career

Newman played for Neath and Swansea at amateur level.

Professional career

He started at Northampton Saints and won the Heineken Cup with them in 2000 but he finished playing with them in 2001.

He moved on to play with the Ospreys in 2003. He made 75 appearances for the Welsh team and scored 6 tries with them. He won the Celtic League while with Ospreys.

He signed for Glasgow Warriors in 2006.

He also played for Grenoble and London Scottish.

International career

He was capped by Wales at U21 level and at 'A' grade.

Business career

He moved into Finance and now works with LGT Vestra.

References

External links

Scottish Rugby interview

1978 births
Living people
FC Grenoble players
Glasgow Warriors players
London Scottish F.C. players
Neath RFC players
Northampton Saints players
Ospreys (rugby union) players
Rugby union players from Leicester
Swansea RFC players
Welsh rugby union players
Rugby union locks